The Emblem of Uttarakhand is the official state seal used by the Government of Uttarakhand and is carried on all official correspondences made by State of Uttarakhand. It was adopted by the newly formed Interim Government of Uttarakhand at the establishment of the state on 9 November 2000.

Description 
The Emblem of Uttarakhand is a diamond-shaped emblem of white background and blue borders supported by the stylized mountain peaks of the Himalayas with four streams charging from the left to right.
The National Emblem of India, Lion Capital of Ashoka is superimposed on a small red background on its crest with the national motto in Devanagari, "सत्यमेव जयते" (Satyameva Jayate, Sanskrit for "Truth Alone Triumphs") is presented below.
At the bottom of the emblem it reads "उत्तराखण्ड राज्य" (Hindi for "State of Uttarakhand") having inscribed in blue fonts.

Symbolism
The red background on the top represents the blood of statehood activists who lost their lives during the course of Uttarakhand statehood movement, while the white background represents the peaceful nature of the Uttarakhandi people.
The mountains represent the geography and ecology of the Himalayan state and the four streams represent the; Ganga.
Blue colour symbolizes purity of water attributed to the holy rivers of Uttarakhand.

Government banner
The Government of Uttarakhand can be represented by a banner displaying the emblem of the state on a white field.

See also
Uttarakhand Devabhumi Matribhumi
List of Uttarakhand state symbols
National Emblem of India
Lion Capital of Ashoka
Lozenge
List of Indian state emblems

References

Government of Uttarakhand
Uttarakhand
Uttarakhand
Uttarakhand
Symbols of Uttarakhand